This is the filmography of American actor Henry Fonda (May 16, 1905 – August 12, 1982). From the beginning of Fonda's career in 1935 through to his last projects in 1981, Fonda appeared in 106 films, television programs, and shorts.

Through the course of his career he appeared in many critically acclaimed films, including 12 Angry Men and The Ox-Bow Incident. His roles in 1940's The Grapes of Wrath and 1981's On Golden Pond both earned him Academy Award nominations and he won for the latter.  Fonda made his mark in Westerns, appearing as Frank James in Jesse James and The Return of Frank James, and war films such as The Longest Day and In Harm's Way, and made frequent appearances in both television and foreign productions late in his career. He was Bette Davis' leading man in the romantic period piece Jezebel and portrayed historical figures Abraham Lincoln in Young Mr. Lincoln and Wyatt Earp in My Darling Clementine.  Fonda made four movies with his close friend James Stewart; On Our Merry Way, How the West Was Won, Firecreek, and The Cheyenne Social Club.  Henry Fonda made no major film appearances between 1948's Fort Apache with John Wayne and Mister Roberts with James Cagney in 1955, seven years later, concentrating instead on the stage; both films were directed by John Ford.

Filmography

Feature films

Television films

External links 

 
 
 

Fonda, Henry
Fonda, Henry